The Constitutional Bloc may refer to:
Constitutional Bloc (Bulgaria), a defunct political alliance in Bulgaria
Constitutional Bloc (Lebanon), a political party in Lebanon, now defunct, continued as Constitutional Union Party 
Constitutional block (France), French texts having the same force as the Constitution